The following is a discography of production by Q-Tip, an American hip hop musician, record producer, and DJ. All songs credited as "produced by A Tribe Called Quest" were produced by Q-Tip, with the exception of "True Fuschnick", "Heavenly Father", and "La Schmoove" by Fu-Schnickens, which were produced by Ali Shaheed Muhammad. Q-Tip's contributions as a member of The Ummah production team are also listed. Q-Tip has also been credited under the pseudonyms "The Abstract", "The Lone Ranger", and "Qualiall".

1988

Jungle Brothers - Straight out the Jungle 
 13. "The Promo" (featuring Q-Tip) (produced by Jungle Brothers & Q-Tip [uncredited])

1989

A Tribe Called Quest - unreleased demo tape 
 03. "Native Tongue"
 05. "Dust (My Pal)"

De La Soul - 3 Feet High and Rising 
 19. "Description" (produced by Prince Paul, De La Soul & Q-Tip)

1990

A Tribe Called Quest - Bonita Applebum (VLS) 

 A1. "Bonita Applebum (Hootie Mix)"

A Tribe Called Quest - I Left My Wallet in El Segundo (VLS) 

 B1. "Pubic Enemy (Saturday Night Virus Discomix)"

A Tribe Called Quest - People's Instinctive Travels and the Paths of Rhythm 
 01. "Push It Along"
 02. "Luck of Lucien"
 03. "After Hours"
 04. "Footprints"	
 05. "I Left My Wallet in El Segundo"		
 06. "Pubic Enemy"
 07. "Bonita Applebum"		
 08. "Can I Kick It?"		
 09. "Youthful Expression"
 10. "Rhythm (Devoted to the Art of Moving Butts)"
 11. "Mr. Muhammad"
 12. "Ham 'n' Eggs"
 13. "Go Ahead in the Rain"
 14. "Description of a Fool"

Unity 2 - What Is It, Yo?! (VLS) 
 A1. "What Is It, Yo?! (Jeep Mix)"

1991

A Tribe Called Quest - Hits, Rarities & Remixes 
 06. "Mr. Incognito" (released in 2003)

A Tribe Called Quest - Jazz (We've Got) (VLS) 
 A2. "Jazz (We've Got) (Re-Recording)"

A Tribe Called Quest - The Low End Theory 
 01. "Excursions"
 02. "Buggin' Out"
 03. "Rap Promoter"
 04. "Butter"
 05. "Verses from the Abstract" (featuring Vinia Mojica & Ron Carter)
 06. "Show Business" (featuring Diamond D, Lord Jamar & Sadat X) (produced by Skeff Anselm, co-produced by Q-Tip)
 07. "Vibes and Stuff"
 08. "The Infamous Date Rape"
 09. "Check the Rhime"
 10. "Everything Is Fair" (produced by Skeff Anselm, co-produced by Q-Tip)
 11. "Jazz (We've Got)" (originally produced by Pete Rock)
 12. "Skypager"
 13. "What?"
 14. "Scenario" (featuring Leaders of the New School)

1992

Chi-Ali - Roadrunner (VLS) 
 A2. "Roadrunner (Puberty Mix)"

Diamond D - Stunts, Blunts and Hip Hop 
 19. "K.I.S.S. (Keep It Simple Stupid)" (produced by Diamond D, co-produced by Q-Tip)

A Tribe Called Quest - Scenario (VLS) 
 B1. "Scenario (Remix)" (featuring Kid Hood & Leaders of the New School)

Various artists - Boomerang soundtrack 
 12. "Hot Sex" (performed by A Tribe Called Quest)

1993

Apache - Apache Ain't Shit 
 04. "Gangsta Bitch"

Jungle Brothers - On the Road Again (My Jimmy Weighs a Ton) (VLS) 
 A2. "On the Road Again (My Jimmy Weighs a Ton) (Q-Tip Remix)" (featuring Q-Tip)

Run-DMC - Down with the King 
 02. "Come on Everybody" (featuring Q-Tip)

Tiger - Claws of the Cat 
 05. "Who Planned It" (featuring Q-Tip)

A Tribe Called Quest - Midnight Marauders 
 01. "Midnight Marauders Tour Guide"
 02. "Steve Biko (Stir It Up)"
 03. "Award Tour" (featuring Trugoy the Dove)
 05. "Sucka Nigga"	
 06. "Midnight" (featuring Raphael Wiggins)	
 07. "We Can Get Down"	
 08. "Electric Relaxation"	
 09. "Clap Your Hands"	
 10. "Oh My God" (featuring Busta Rhymes)	
 12. "The Chase, Part II"	
 13. "Lyrics to Go"	
 14. "God Lives Through"

A Tribe Called Quest - N/A 
 00. "Bound to Wreck Your Body" (The Chase, Part I)

1994

Craig Mack - Get Down Remix (VLS) 
 A2. "Get Down (Q-Tip Remix)" (featuring Q-Tip)

Nas - Illmatic 
 07. "One Love"

Nas - The World Is Yours (VLS) 
 B1. "The World Is Yours (Tip Mix)"

A Tribe Called Quest - Oh My God (VLS) 
 A2. "Oh My God (Remix)"
 B3. "One Two Shit" (featuring Busta Rhymes)

Various artists - Crooklyn, Volume 1: Music from the Motion Picture 
 01. "Crooklyn" (performed by Crooklyn Dodgers)

1995

Mobb Deep - The Infamous
 06. "Give Up the Goods (Just Step)" (featuring Big Noyd)
 07. "Temperature's Rising" (featuring Crystal Johnson) (co-produced by Mobb Deep)
 14. "Drink Away the Pain (Situations)" (featuring Q-Tip) (co-produced by Mobb Deep)

Mobb Deep - Temperature's Rising (VLS) 
 A1. "Temperature's Rising (Remix)" (featuring Crystal Johnson)

Science of Sound - Kaleidoscope Phonetics 
 07. "It Ain't Safe"

Various artists - The Show: The Soundtrack 
 22. "Glamour and Glitz" (performed by A Tribe Called Quest)

1996

Busta Rhymes - The Coming 
 08. "Ill Vibe" (featuring Q-Tip)

Cypress Hill - Unreleased and Revamped 
 07. "Illusions (Q-Tip Remix)"

Da Bush Babees - Gravity 
 06. "3 MCs" (featuring Q-Tip)

The Roots - Illadelph Halflife 
 17. "Ital (The Universal Side)" (featuring Q-Tip) (produced by The Grand Negaz, co-produced by Q-Tip)

A Tribe Called Quest - Beats, Rhymes and Life 
 01. "Phony Rappers" 
 03. "Motivators" 
 04. "Jam" 	
 06. "The Pressure"
 08. "Mind Power" 
 11. "Baby Phife's Return"

 13. "What Really Goes On"

Various artists - High School High: The Soundtrack 
 13. "Peace, Prosperity & Paper" (performed by A Tribe Called Quest)

Young Zee - Musical Meltdown 
 17. "Everybody Get (Remix)"

1997

The Lone Ranger (aka Q-Tip) - It's Yours (VLS) 
 A1. "It's Yours"
 A3. "Moneymaker"

Mariah Carey - Butterfly 
 01. "Honey" (produced by Mariah Carey, Puff Daddy, Stevie J & Q-Tip)

Mint Condition - Let Me Be the One (VLS) 
 B1. "Let Me Be the One (Ummah Remix Featuring Q-Tip)" (featuring Q-Tip)

Towa Tei - Happy 
 04. "Happy (Q-Tip Remix Dub)"

Various artists - Men in Black: The Album 
 10. "Same Ol' Thing" (performed by A Tribe Called Quest)

Various artists - Rhyme & Reason soundtrack 
 02. "Wild Hot" (performed by Busta Rhymes & A Tribe Called Quest) (produced by Busta Rhymes & Q-Tip)

1998

A Tribe Called Quest - The Love Movement 
 05. "Like It Like That" 
 06. "Common Ground (Get It Goin' On)"
 09. "Give Me" (featuring Noreaga)
 10. "Pad & Pen" (featuring D-Life)
 12. "Hot 4 U"
 14. "The Love"
 15. "Rock Rock Y'all" (featuring  Punchline, Jane Doe, Wordsworth & Mos Def)

Various artists - Slam: The Soundtrack 
 08. "Hey" (performed by Q-Tip)

1999

Heavy D - Heavy 
 04. "Listen" (featuring Q-Tip) (produced by Jay Dee & Q-Tip)

Q-Tip - Amplified 
(All songs produced by Jay Dee & Q-Tip, except where noted.)
 01. "Wait Up"
 02. "Higher"
 03. "Breathe and Stop" (produced by Jay Dee)
 04. "Moving with U"
 05. "Let's Ride"
 06. "Things U Do"
 07. "All In" (featuring Meda Leacock)
 08. "Go Hard"
 10. "Vivrant Thing" (produced by Q-Tip)
 12. "End of Time" (featuring Korn)
 13. "Do It, See It, Be It" (hidden track)

Various artists - The PJs: Music from & Inspired by the Hit Television Series 
 10. "Get Involved" (performed and produced by Raphael Saadiq & Q-Tip)

2000

Mobb Deep, Big Noyd & Roxanne Shante - The Second Coming (VLS) 
 B1. "We Live This (Dirty)" (Q-Tip version)

Various artists - La Contrebande - Mixtape Vol. 1 
 B5. "Truc D'MC (Remix)" (performed by Faf Larage & Vasquez Lusi)

Whitney Houston - Heartbreak Hotel (CDS) 
 04. "Megamix (Love to Infinity Edit)" (produced by Raphael Saadiq & Q-Tip, additional production by Love to Infinity)

Whitney Houston - Whitney: The Greatest Hits 
 2-01. "Fine" (produced by Raphael Saadiq & Q-Tip)

2001

Q-Tip - Kamaal the Abstract 
(Recorded in 2001, the album was shelved by Arista Records before being released in 2009 on Battery Records.)
 01. "Feelin"
 02. "Do You Dig U?" (featuring Kurt Rosenwinkel & Gary Thomas)
 03. "A Million Times"
 04. "Blue Girl"
 05. "Barely in Love"
 06. "Heels"
 07. "Abstractionisms" (featuring Kenny Garrett a.k.a. Truth)
 08. "Caring"
 09. "Even If It Is So"
 10. "Make It Work" (CD, LP bonus track)
 11. "Damn You're Cool" (LP, iTunes bonus track)

Q-Tip - Makin' It Blend (VLS) 
 B3. "Jay Dee / Q-Tip Beats Skit" (produced by Jay Dee & Q-Tip)

Various artists - Prison Song soundtrack (unreleased) 
 00. "Mom's Song" (performed by Mary J. Blige)
 00. "Big Pete's Rap" (performed by Fat Joe)
 00. "The Shower" (performed by Q-Tip)
 00. "The Yard" (performed by Q-Tip)

2002

Q-Tip - "A" List DJ Promo 
 A1. "Breathe and Stop 2002"

Various artists - Soundbombing III 
 10. "What Lies Beneath" (performed by Q-Tip)

2003

Kurt Rosenwinkel - Heartcore 
(All songs produced by Kurt Rosenwinkel and co-produced by Q-Tip.)
 01. "Heartcore"
 02. "Blue Line"
 03. "All the Way to Rajasthan"
 04. "Your Vision"
 05. "Interlude"
 06. "Our Secret World"
 07. "Dream/Memory?"
 08. "Love in the Modern World"
 09. "dcba//>>"
 10. "Thought About You"
 11. "Tone Poem"

Stanley Clarke - 1, 2, to the Bass 
 01. "1, 2, to the Bass" (featuring Q-Tip) (produced by Stanley Clarke, co-produced by Q-Tip)

2004

Nas - Street's Disciple 
 1-04. "American Way" (featuring Kelis)

Q-Tip - Open (unreleased) 
(Completed by 2004, the album was shelved by Universal Motown Records. Tracks 1, 3, 9, 10, and 15 were reworked and featured on The Renaissance.)
 01. "Johnny Died"
 02. "Black Boy"
 03. "Official"
 04. "Hard" (aka "N/A") (featuring Common)
 05. "Request" (aka "Say Something for Me")
 06. "Interlude"
 07. "I'm Not Gone Have It" 
 08. "Unknown"
 09. "Feelings"
 10. "Where Do You Go"
 11. "Unidentified"
 12. "Be Brave" (aka "That's Sexy") (featuring André 3000)
 13. "Late Mornin'"
 15. "I Believe" (featuring D'Angelo)
 16. "Lisa (Extended Instrumental)"
 17. "Instrumental"
 18. "Lisa"

2005

Q-Tip - N/A 
 00. "For the Nasty (Remix)" (featuring Busta Rhymes)

2006

Q-Tip - N/A 
 00. "Passes You By"

2007

Q-Tip - Work It Out (VLS) 
 A1. "Work It Out (Clean)"

2008

Q-Tip - N/A 
 00. "Scram Jones"

Q-Tip - The Renaissance 
 01. "Johnny Is Dead"
 02. "Won't Trade"
 03. "Gettin' Up"
 04. "Official"
 05. "You"
 06. "We Fight/We Love" (featuring Raphael Saadiq)
 07. "Manwomanboogie" (featuring Amanda Diva)
 08. "Renaissance Rap" (hidden track after "Move")
 09. "Dance on Glass"
 10. "Life Is Better" (featuring Norah Jones)
 11. "Believe" (featuring D'Angelo)
 12. "Shaka"  
 13. "Good Thang" (digital bonus track)

2009

Grand Puba - Retroactive 
 05. "Good to Go" (featuring Q-Tip)

Q-Tip - N/A 
 00. "We Fight/We Love (Remix)" (featuring Kanye West & Consequence)

2010

Kanye West - Chain Heavy (digital single) 
 01. "Chain Heavy" (featuring Consequence & Talib Kweli)

Kanye West - N/A 
 00. "Mama's Boyfriend" (Q-Tip version)

Layne Harper - N/A 
 00. "City Lights"

Quincy Jones - Q Soul Bossa Nostra 
 09. "Betcha Wouldn't Hurt Me" (featuring Mary J. Blige, Q-Tip & Alfredo Rodríguez) (produced by Q-Tip & Quincy Jones)

2011

Consequence - Movies on Demand 2 
 12. "Got Me Trippin'"

Jay-Z & Kanye West - Watch the Throne 
 02. "Lift Off" (featuring Beyoncé) (produced by Jeff Bhasker, Kanye West & Mike Dean, co-produced by Pharrell & Q-Tip, additional production by Don Jazzy)
 07. "That's My Bitch" (produced by Kanye West & Q-Tip, co-produced by Jeff Bhasker)

2012

Consequence - N/A 
 00. "Trust Fund Baby"

Esperanza Spalding - Radio Music Society
 03. "Crowned & Kissed" (produced by Esperanza Spalding, co-produced by Q-Tip) 
 11. "City of Roses" (produced by Esperanza Spalding, co-produced by Q-Tip)

Roc Marciano - Reloaded 
 12. "Thread Count"

Santigold - Master of My Make-Believe 
 01. "Go!" (featuring Karen O) (produced by Q-Tip, Santigold & Switch)

2013

Busta Rhymes & Q-Tip - The Abstract and the Dragon 
 07. "The Abstract & the Dragon"
 11. "We Taking Off"
 14. "Butch & Sundance"
 16. "Pardon My Ways (ELE 2 Exclusive)"

John Legend - Love in the Future 
 09. "Tomorrow"

2014

Mariah Carey - Me. I Am Mariah... The Elusive Chanteuse 
 10. "Meteorite" (produced by Mariah Carey & Q-Tip)

Mariah Carey - N/A 
 00. "Meteorite Q-Tip Remix"

2015

Pusha T - King Push – Darkest Before Dawn: The Prelude 
 09. "F.I.F.A."

2016

Consequence - N/A 
 00. "The Needle Drop (Here Comes Trouble)"

Solange - A Seat at the Table 
 14. "Borderline (An Ode to Self Care)" (featuring Q-Tip) (produced by Q-Tip & Solange)

Termanology - More Politics 
 05. "We're Both Wrong" (featuring Saigon)

A Tribe Called Quest - We Got It from Here... Thank You 4 Your Service 
(All songs co-produced by Blair Wells.)
 01. "The Space Program"  	
 02. "We the People...."  	
 03. "Whateva Will Be"  	
 04. "Solid Wall of Sound"  	
 05. "Dis Generation"  	
 06. "Kids..."  	
 07. "Melatonin"  	
 08. "Enough!!"  	
 09. "Mobius"  	
 10. "Black Spasmodic"  	
 11. "The Killing Season"  	
 12. "Lost Somebody"  	
 13. "Movin Backwards"  	
 14. "Conrad Tokyo"  	
 15. "Ego"  	
 16. "The Donald"

2018

Anderson .Paak - Oxnard
 12. "Cheers" (featuring Q-Tip) (produced by Focus..., Q-Tip & Dr. Dre, co-produced by Andre Brissett)

Kendrick Lamar & Q-Tip - N/A
 00. "Want U 2 Want"

Neek the Exotic - Hell Up in Queens
 02. "Hell Up in Queens" (featuring Stoxx)

Roc Marciano - Behold a Dark Horse
 13. "Consigliere"

Various artists - Revamp: Reimagining the Songs of Elton John & Bernie Taupin
 08. "Don't Go Breaking My Heart" (performed by Q-Tip & Demi Lovato)

2019

Danny Brown - U Know What I'm Sayin?
 03. "Dirty Laundry"
 07. "Best Life"
 11. "Combat"

2021

Cordae - Just Until...
01. "More Life" (featuring Q-Tip) (produced by Eric Hudson, Kid Culture & Q-Tip)

2023

LL Cool J - TBA 
 TBA

References

External links
Q-Tip credits at Discogs
A Tribe Called Quest credits at Discogs
Q-Tip credits at AllMusic
A Tribe Called Quest credits at AllMusic

 
Discographies of American artists
Hip hop discographies
Production discographies